Al-Qassabin is a town in northwestern Syria, administratively part of the Jableh District of the Latakia Governorate, and located south of Latakia. Nearby localities include Ayn al-Sharqiyah and Beit Yashout to the east and Siyano, Jableh and Bustan al-Basha to the northwest. According to the Syria Central Bureau of Statistics, al-Qassabin had a population of 780 in the 2004 census. Its inhabitants are predominantly Alawites.

The town is notable as the birthplace of the Syrian poet Ali Ahmed Said, better known as Adunis.

References

Alawite communities in Syria
Populated places in Jableh District
Towns in Syria